Case of Prohibitions [1607] EWHC J23 (KB) is a UK constitutional law case decided by Sir Edward Coke. Before the Glorious Revolution of 1688, when the sovereignty of Parliament was confirmed, this case wrested supremacy from the King in favour of the courts.

Facts
King James I placed himself in the position of judge for a dispute, a "controversy of land between parties was heard by the King, and sentence given".

Judgments
When the case went before Edward Coke, the Chief Justice of the Court of Common Pleas, he overturned the decision of the King, and held that cases may be tried only by those with legal training and subject to the rule of law. Coke stated that common law cases were "not to be decided by natural reason but by artificial reason and judgment of law, which law is an art which requires long study and experience":

In another report, Coke is quoted as saying all causes were "to be measured by the golden and straight met-wand of the law, and not to the incertain and crooked cord of discretion".

See also

Notes

References

Sources
Owen Hood Phillips, Leading Cases in Constitutional Law (Sweet & Maxwell, London, 1957) Ch. 13, pp 46–47

External links
Full text of judgment on Bailii

1607 in English law
Edward Coke cases
Royal prerogative
Parliament of England
Sovereignty
Court of Common Pleas (England) cases
United Kingdom constitutional case law